The Transcaucasian Socialist Federative Soviet Republic (Transcaucasian SFSR or TSFSR), also known as the Transcaucasian Soviet Federative Socialist Republic, or simply Transcaucasia, was a republic of the Soviet Union that existed from 1922 to 1936.

The TSFSR comprised Armenia, Azerbaijan and Georgia, traditionally known as the "Transcaucasian Republics" as they were separated from Russia by the Caucasus Mountains. The TSFSR was one of the four republics to sign the Treaty on the Creation of the USSR establishing the Soviet Union in 1922. The TSFSR was created ostensibly to consolidate the economic situation and Bolshevik control over the region. The TSFSR was dissolved upon the adoption of the 1936 Soviet Constitution and its constituent republics were elevated individually to republics of the Soviet Union.

History 
The roots of a Transcaucasian condominium state trace back to the dissolution of the Russian Empire in 1918, following the October Revolution, when the provinces of the Caucasus seceded and formed their own state called the Transcaucasian Federation. Competing ethno-national interests and confrontation with the Ottoman Empire in World War I led to the dissolution of the Transcaucasian Federation only two months later, in April 1918.

The three successor states: the First Republic of Armenia, the Democratic Republic of Azerbaijan, and the Democratic Republic of Georgia, lasted until the end of the Russian Civil War that was being fought across the mountains, when they were invaded by the Red Army and sovietized. Following the proposal by Vladimir Lenin the three now Soviet Republics, the Armenian, Azerbaijani and Georgian SSRs, were united into the Federative Union of Socialist Soviet Republics of Transcaucasia on 12 March 1922. On 13 December that year, the First All-Caucasian Congress of Soviets transformed this federation of states into a unified federal state and renamed it into the Transcaucasian Socialist Federative Soviet Republic, though keeping formally the autonomy of its constituent republics. The congress also adopted the constitution, appointed the Central Executive Committee (the highest legislative body between congressional sessions), and the Council of People's Commissars (the government). Mamia Orakhelashvili, a Georgian Bolshevik leader, became the first chairman of the Transcaucasian SFSR's Council of People's Commissars. Tbilisi was the capital of the republic.

The republic became a founding member of the Soviet Union on 30 December along with the Russian SFSR, the Ukrainian SSR, and the Belorussian SSR. In December 1936, the Transcaucasian SFSR was dissolved and divided again among the Georgian, Armenian and Azerbaijani SSRs.

Autonomous republics within TSFSR 

After the Red Army invasion of Georgia, Abkhazia (an autonomous province within the Democratic Republic of Georgia) was declared a Soviet Republic. In March 1922, the Abkhaz Revolutionary committee renamed the region the SSR of Abkhazia. Despite the declaration of this new Soviet Republic, its relations with Georgia and Russia had yet to be formally settled. On December 16, 1921, Abkhazia signed a treaty of alliance with the Georgian SSR codifying its status as a treaty republic (Russian: договорная республика). This agreement allowed the formation of an Abkhazia military while also establishing a political and financial union between the two Soviet republics. Thus, through Georgia, Abkhazia joined the TSFSR and was initially on an equal footing with the other republics of the federation. On February 19, 1931, Abkhazia's republican status was downgraded to that of an Autonomous Soviet Socialist Republic within the Georgian SSR.

The Adjar ASSR was established on July 16, 1921, within the Georgian SSR as a consequence of the Treaty of Kars. The treaty marking the end of the Caucasus Campaign in World War I provided for the division of the former Batum Oblast of the Kutais Governorate of the Russian Empire between Georgia and Turkey. According to the agreement the northern half with significant Georgian Muslim population would become part of the Soviet Georgia but granted autonomy.

Another autonomous republic was established in July 1920 in Nakhchivan, an area bordering Armenia, Turkey and Iran, which was claimed by Armenians and Azerbaijanis. After the occupation of the region by the Red Army, the Nakhchivan Autonomous Soviet Socialist Republic was declared with "close ties" to the Azerbaijani SSR. The Treaty of Moscow and the Treaty of Kars established the Nakhchivan region as an autonomous republic under the protection of the Soviet Republic of Azerbaijan.

Heads of state

Stamps and postal history 

Before 1923, Georgia, Armenia, and Azerbaijan each issued their own postage stamps. The Transcaucasian Federation began issuing its own stamps on September 15, 1923, and superseded the separate republics' issues on October 1.

The first issues consisted of some of the stamps of Russia and Armenia overprinted with a star containing the five-letter acronym of the Federation inside the points. Massive inflation having set in, this was followed by an issue of the Federation's own designs, four values of a view of oil fields, and four with a montage of Soviet symbols over mountains and oil derricks, values ranging from 40,000 to 500,000 roubles. The 40,000 roubles and 75,000 roubles were then surcharged to 700,000 roubles. On October 24, the stamps were re-issued with values from 1 to 18 gold kopecks. Starting in 1924, the Federation used stamps of the Soviet Union.

Most of the stamps of the Federation are not especially rare today, with 1998 prices in the US$1–2 range, although the overprints on Armenian stamps range up to US$200. As might be expected from a short period of usage, used stamps are less common than unused and covers are not often seen.

See also 

 Kars Republic
 Mountain Autonomous Soviet Socialist Republic
 Lithuanian–Belorussian Soviet Socialist Republic
 Far Eastern Republic
 Don Republic
 Kuban People's Republic
 Bavarian Soviet Republic
 Republics of the Soviet Union
 Komancza Republic

Notes

Bibliography
 
 
 
 
 
 

 
Early Soviet republics
Communism in Armenia
Communism in Azerbaijan
Communism in Georgia (country)
Former countries in Western Asia
Former countries in Europe
Former socialist republics
History of the Caucasus under the Soviet Union
Modern history of Azerbaijan
Georgian Soviet Socialist Republic
Modern history of Armenia
Modern history of Georgia (country)
Azerbaijan Soviet Socialist Republic
States and territories established in 1922
States and territories disestablished in 1936
1922 establishments in Russia
1936 disestablishments in the Soviet Union
1922 establishments in Asia
1936 disestablishments in Asia
1922 establishments in Europe
1936 disestablishments in Europe

1930s in Armenia

1930s in Azerbaijan

1930s in Georgia (country)
Armenian-speaking countries and territories
Azerbaijani-speaking countries and territories
Russian-speaking countries and territories
Former countries of the interwar period
Republics of the Soviet Union
Post–Russian Empire states